Ride is a 2009 Indian Telugu-language action romance film starring Nani, Aksha Pardasany, Tanish and Shweta Basu Prasad. It was directed by Ramesh Varma and produced by Bellamkonda Suresh. Prominent singer Hemachandra composed the film's music. The film was released on 5 June 2009 and was a Box Office success.

Plot
Arjun (Nani), an engineering college student, longs for a bike. However, his father (Ahuti Prasad) does not fulfill his wish. Mahesh (Tanish), hailing from a middle-class family, has two sisters. His father (Y. Kasi Viswanath) is a retired man, and his family survives on his pension. Mahesh wants to help his father and searches for a job. He gets a job in Kapil Chit Funds as a collection agent, but the manager puts a condition that Mahesh should have a two-wheeler. Mahesh's mother (Tulasi) sells off some silver articles, and he purchases a bike to join the job. One day, Mahesh's father suffers a stroke, and Mahesh loses his bike while bringing medicines. Though he lodges a police complaint, it is of no avail. Mahesh goes jobless without the bike. One day Mahesh finds Arjun riding his bike, and they fight with each other for the bike. Mahesh learns that Arjun has purchased the bike in a black market after winning a bike race. They finally come to an understanding on the advice of a pandit to use the bike to suit the convenience of each other by dividing the day. They keep their promise and use the bike judiciously.

One day, some goons attack Arjun and gravely injure him. Mahesh, who finds him in an unconscious state, admits him in the hospital and informs Arjun's parents. After that incident, both Arjun and Mahesh become friends. At this juncture, their bike goes missing again. The person who stole their bike calls them and plays tricks upon them. Arjun and Mahesh learn that he is the brother of Arjun's girlfriend Puja (Aksha Pardasany) and he is in love with Mahesh's girlfriend Rani (Shweta Basu Prasad). He tries to take revenge against the two boys by playing with their bike. In the climax, Arjun decides to participate in a motorcycle race and get the bike as a prize to present it to Mahesh as it is a necessity for him. Mahesh too wants to get back the bike from the person who stole the bike as Arjun has a passion for the bike. Each of them try in their own way and get two bikes. The film ends on a happy note as the problem gets solved, but they keep exchanging their bikes as usual and continue their friendship.

Cast

Nani as Arjun
Aksha Pardasany as Puja
Tanish as Mahesh
Swetha Basu Prasad as Rani
Adarsh Balakrishna as Gaja
Ahuti Prasad as Arjun's father
Y. Kasi Viswanath as Mahesh's father
Tulasi as Mahesh's mother
Praveen as Mahesh's friend
Narasimha as Arjun's friend
Shyamala as Rani's friend
Brahmanandam
Sudha
Hema
Navdeep in a special appearance

Soundtrack

Music is composed by Sivaram Shankar and Lyrics by Bhashyasree

Awards
 Fight masters Ram and Lakshman won Nandi Award for Best Action Sequences.

References

External links

2009 films
2000s Telugu-language films
Films directed by Ramesh Varma